Clifford Henry Taubes (born February 21, 1954) is the William Petschek Professor of Mathematics at Harvard University and works in gauge field theory, differential geometry, and low-dimensional topology. His brother is the journalist Gary Taubes.

Early career
Taubes received his PhD in physics in 1980 under the direction of Arthur Jaffe, having proven results collected in  about the existence of solutions to the Landau–Ginzburg vortex equations and the Bogomol'nyi monopole equations.

Soon, he began applying his gauge-theoretic expertise to pure mathematics.  His work on the boundary of the moduli space of solutions to the Yang-Mills equations was used by Simon Donaldson in his proof of Donaldson's theorem. He proved in  that R4 has an uncountable number of smooth structures (see also exotic R4), and (with Raoul Bott in ) proved Witten's rigidity theorem on the elliptic genus.

Work based on Seiberg–Witten theory 

In a series of four long papers in the 1990s (collected in ), Taubes proved that, on a closed symplectic four-manifold, the (gauge-theoretic) Seiberg–Witten invariant is equal to an invariant which enumerates certain pseudoholomorphic curves and is now known as Taubes's Gromov invariant.  This fact improved mathematicians' understanding of the topology of symplectic four-manifolds.

Expanding both on this and on the equivalence of the Seiberg–Witten and Gromov invariants, Taubes has also proven (in a long series of preprints, beginning with ) that a contact 3-manifold's embedded contact homology is isomorphic to a version of its Seiberg–Witten Floer cohomology. More recently, Taubes, C. Kutluhan and Y-J. Lee proved that embedded contact homology is isomorphic to Heegaard Floer homology.

Honors and awards

Four-time speaker at International Congress of Mathematicians (1986, 1994 (plenary), 1998, 2010 (plenary; selected, but did not speak))
Veblen Prize (AMS) (1991)
Elie Cartan Prize (Académie des Sciences) (1993)
Elected as a fellow of the American Academy of Arts and Sciences in 1995.
Elected to the National Academy of Sciences in 1996.
Clay Research Award (2008)
NAS Award in Mathematics (2008) from the National Academy of Sciences.
Shaw Prize in Mathematics (2009) jointly with Simon Donaldson

Books
 1980: (with Arthur Jaffe) Vortices and Monopoles: The Structure of Static Gauge Theories, Progress in Physics, volume 2, Birkhäuser  
 1993: The L2 Moduli Spaces on Four Manifold With Cylindrical Ends (Monographs in Geometry and Topology)
 1996: Metrics, Connections and Gluing Theorems (CBMS Regional Conference Series in Mathematics) 
 2008 [2001]: Modeling Differential Equations in Biology 
 2011: Differential Geometry: Bundles, Connections, Metrics and Curvature, (Oxford Graduate Texts in Mathematics #23)

References

External links

Profile in the May 2008 Notices of the AMS, marking his receipt of the NAS Award in Mathematics

1954 births
Living people
20th-century American mathematicians
21st-century American mathematicians
Clay Research Award recipients
Harvard University alumni
Harvard University faculty
Members of the United States National Academy of Sciences
Topologists
Scientists from Rochester, New York
Mathematicians from New York (state)